The 2007 Tour du Haut Var was the 39th edition of the Tour du Haut Var cycle race and was held on 25 February 2007. The race started and finished in Draguignan. The race was won by Filippo Pozzato.

General classification

References

2007
2007 in road cycling
2007 in French sport